Richard Eusebio Chávez Chonate (born 12 December 2000) is a Peruvian footballer who plays as a midfielder for Peruvian Segunda División side Deportivo Llacuabamba.

Career

Club career
After five years at César Vallejo, Chávez moved to Peruvian Primera División side Carlos A. Mannucci for the 2020 season to get closer to professional football. He got his official debut on 2 February 2020 against FC Carlos Stein. Chávez was in the starting lineup but was replaced in the 73rd minute.

On 5 August 2020, his contract with Carlos A. Mannucci was extended until the end of 2023, after having played four games for the club. At the end of February 2022, Chávez was loaned out to Peruvian Segunda División club Comerciantes Unidos.

In January 2023, Chávez joined Peruvian Segunda División side Deportivo Llacuabamba.

References

External links
 

Living people
2000 births
Peruvian footballers
Association football midfielders
People from Lima
Club Deportivo Universidad César Vallejo footballers
Carlos A. Mannucci players
Comerciantes Unidos footballers
Peruvian Primera División players
Peruvian Segunda División players